Shot Forth Self Living is the debut studio album by American rock band Medicine, released on September 15, 1992 on Def American.

Track listing

Personnel 
Medicine
Jim Goodall – drums
Brad Laner – vocals, guitar, percussion, piano, production
Jim Putnam – guitar
Eddie Ruscha – bass guitar, tape, art direction, design
Beth Thompson – vocals
Production and additional personnel
Chris Apthorp – engineering
John Cevetello – engineering on "Aruca"
Sneaky Pete Kleinow – steel guitar on "A Short Happy Life" and "Christmas Song"
Joan Mahoney – photography
Tom Recchion – art direction, design

References

External links 
 

1992 debut albums
American Recordings (record label) albums
Medicine (band) albums